The 2nd Yeltsovka is a small river in Novosibirsk Oblast, Russia, right tributary of the Ob. Its length is 14 km (8.7 mi), with a drainage basin of 42 square kilometres.

The 2nd Yeltsovka flows out of a small lake at the village of Klyukvenny, runs southwest through Novosibirsky District, then Kalininsky and Zayeltsovsky districts of Novosibirsk, flows into the Ob.

Gallery

See also
 Kamenka River

External links
 2nd Yeltsovka River. State Water Register. Река 2-я Ельцовка. Государственный водный реестр.

Rivers of Novosibirsk
Rivers of Novosibirsk Oblast
Novosibirsky District